Leucanopsis malodonta is a moth of the family Erebidae, and was described by Harrison Gray Dyar Jr. in 1914. Leucanopsis malodonta can be found in Peru.

References

 Arctiidae genus list at Butterflies and Moths of the World of the Natural History Museum

malodonta
Moths described in 1914